Alice Rose Connor (born 2 August 1990) is a British actress, born in Buckinghamshire, England. She is best known for her roles in the television adaptation of Jacqueline Wilson's novel The Illustrated Mum, in the children's television series The New Worst Witch (a spin-off from The Worst Witch), and in the film The Thief Lord as Hornet. She first started acting as herself in Fun Song Factory. She also had a small part in the 2001 movie A Knight's Tale. Alice Connor also 
starred in the programme My Spy Family as Elle Bannon, which was shown on Boomerang in the UK. She also attended the Misbourne School. She is the granddaughter of actor Kenneth Connor.

She is currently the artistic director at The Theatre Shed.

Filmography

References

External links

 

1990 births
Living people
British actresses